Located in Knoxville, Tennessee, Knoxville Locomotive Works  is an affiliate of Gulf & Ohio Railways. Since its establishment in 1998, Knoxville Locomotive Works (KLW) has repowered, refurbished, remanufactured, and/or upgraded over 400 locomotives. Today, KLW offers its own line of green, single-engine, repowered locomotives from 1,000 hp four axle switchers up to 3,200 hp six axle line haul locomotives. 

In addition to green locomotives, KLW also offers conventional services, such as locomotive rebuilding and refurbishment services for traditional locomotives. KLW has a field services branch with four service regions (Northeast, Southeast, Midwest, West Coast), and a locomotive leasing and sales division.

Model information

References

Gulf and Ohio Railways
Rolling stock leasing companies
Companies based in Knoxville, Tennessee